Mykhailo Vasylyovych Burch (born 15 April 1960) is a former Ukrainian football player. Besides Ukraine, he played in Poland and Slovakia.

References

1960 births
People from Kokshetau
Living people
Soviet footballers
Ukrainian footballers
FC Volyn Lutsk players
FC Spartak Ivano-Frankivsk players
FC SKA-Karpaty Lviv players
Ukrainian Premier League players
Wisła Płock players
Hutnik Warsaw players
NK Veres Rivne players
FC Sokil Zolochiv players
FC Kalush players
Soviet expatriate footballers
Ukrainian expatriate footballers
Expatriate footballers in Poland
Expatriate footballers in Slovakia
Soviet expatriate sportspeople in Poland
Ukrainian expatriate sportspeople in Poland
Ukrainian expatriate sportspeople in Slovakia
Association football goalkeepers